The Toronto Blue Jays farm system consists of seven Minor League Baseball affiliates across the United States and in Canada and the Dominican Republic. Three teams are independently owned, while the Dunedin Blue Jays, Florida Complex League Blue Jays, and two Dominican Summer League squads are owned by the major league club.

The Blue Jays have been affiliated with the Double-A New Hampshire Fisher Cats of the Eastern League since 2004, making it the longest-running active affiliation in the organization among teams not owned by the Blue Jays. Their newest affiliate is the Buffalo Bisons of the International League, which became the Blue Jays' Triple-A club in 2013. The longest affiliation in team history was the 31-year relationship with the Triple-A International League's Syracuse Chiefs from 1978 to 2008.

2021–present
The current structure of Minor League Baseball is the result of an overall contraction of the system beginning with the 2021 season. Class A was reduced to two levels: High-A and Low-A. Class A Short Season teams and domestic Rookie League teams that operated away from Spring Training facilities were eliminated. Low-A was reclassified as Single-A in 2022.

1990–2020
Minor League Baseball operated with six classes from 1990 to 2020. The Class A level was subdivided for a second time with the creation of Class A-Advanced. The Rookie level consisted of domestic and foreign circuits.

1977–1989
The foundation of the minors' current structure was the result of a reorganization initiated by Major League Baseball (MLB) before the 1963 season. The reduction from six classes to four (Triple-A, Double-AA, Class A, and Rookie) was a response to the general decline of the minors throughout the 1950s and early-1960s when leagues and teams folded due to shrinking attendance caused by baseball fans' preference for staying at home to watch MLB games on television. The only change made within the next 27 years was Class A being subdivided for the first time to form Class A Short Season in 1966.

References

External links 
 Major League Baseball Prospect News: Toronto Blue Jays
 Baseball-Reference: Toronto Blue Jays League Affiliations

Minor league affiliates
Toronto Blue Jays minor league affiliates